John Hamilton-Leslie, 9th Earl of Rothes (1679–1722), was a Scottish nobleman who fought on the side of George I during the Jacobite rising of 1715.

Biography 
John Hamilton-Leslie, born in 1679, was the eldest son of Charles Hamilton, 5th Earl of Haddington, and Margaret Leslie, 8th Countess of Rothes. In 1701, Hamilton-Leslie succeeded his mother as Earl of Rothes, the chief of Clan Leslie. His younger brother became Thomas Hamilton, 6th Earl of Haddington.

On 29 April 1697, Hamilton-Leslie married Lady Jean Hay, the daughter of John Hay, 2nd Marquess of Tweeddale. The couple had eight sons and four daughters.

In 1704, Hamilton-Leslie was appointed Keeper of the Privy Seal of Scotland. In 1707, after the passage of the Acts of Union by the English and Scottish Parliaments, Hamilton-Leslie was appointed as one of the 16 Scottish Representative peers to sit in the English House of Lords. He served as representative peer until 1722. In 1714, George I appointed Hamilton-Leslie as vice admiral of Scotland.

In the Jacobite rising of 1715, Hamilton-Leslie fought for George I in Scotland against the pretender James Francis Edward Stuart. In a skirmish at Kinross, Hamilton-Leslie led a troop of the Scots Greys that defeated the Jacobites and took Sir Thomas Bruce captive. At the Battle of Sheriffmuir, he led a group of volunteer fighters. Hamilton-Leslie raised a militia group in Fife that he led against the forces of Rob Roy MacGregor in Falkland, Fife. Hamilton-Leslie turned his own house into a garrison.

In 1716, after the defeat of the Jacobites, George I appointed Hamilton-Leslie as governor of Stirling Castle to compensate him for his property losses during the insurgency. Hamilton-Leslie held this command until 1722. He was also named chamberlain of Fife and Strathearn.

John Hamilton-Leslie died on 9 May 1722 at Leslie House.

References
Information derived from Concise Dictionary of National Biography, 1939. Other sources do not list the role as the Keeper of the Privy Seal.

1679 births
1722 deaths
9
Scottish representative peers
Lords High Commissioner to the General Assembly of the Church of Scotland
Royal Scots Greys officers
People of the Jacobite rising of 1715
Keepers of the Great Seal of Scotland
Lords Privy Seal
People from East Lothian